Terry Kennedy may refer to:

 Terry Kennedy (baseball) (born 1956), American baseball player
 Terry Kennedy (politician), American politician
 Terry Kennedy (skateboarder) (born 1985), American skateboarder
 Terry Kennedy (footballer) (born 1993), English footballer
 Terry Kennedy (speaker) (born 1978), Australian motivational speaker
 Terry Kennedy (rugby union), Irish rugby union player